Bamipine (trade name Soventol) is a pharmaceutical drug acting as an H1 antihistamine with anticholinergic properties. It is used as an antipruritic ointment. No oral use is known.

Adverse effects
Side effects are typical of an old (first-generation) antihistamine: tiredness in adults, agitation in children, mydriasis (dilation of the pupils). These effects are rare when bamipine is applied topically as an ointment. Allergic and hypersensitivity reactions are also rare. Acute eczema can be worsened by bamipine ointment.

Contraindications and interactions
No clinically relevant contraindications or interactions with other drugs are known.

Pharmacology

Pharmacokinetics
When applied topically, the maximal effect is reached after 20 to 60 minutes and lasts up to 48 hours. Bamipine is not absorbed through intact skin in relevant doses.

References 

Piperidines
H1 receptor antagonists